Protein CBFA2T1 is a protein that in humans is encoded by the RUNX1T1 gene.

Function 

The protein encoded by this gene is a putative zinc finger transcription factor and oncoprotein. In acute myeloid leukemia, especially in the M2 subtype, the t(8;21)(q22;q22) translocation is one of the most frequent karyotypic abnormalities. The translocation produces a chimeric gene made up of the 5'-region of the RUNX1 gene fused to the 3'-region of this gene. The chimeric protein is thought to associate with the nuclear corepressor/histone deacetylase complex to block hematopoietic differentiation. Several transcript variants encoding multiple isoforms have been found for this gene.

Interactions 
RUNX1T1 has been shown to interact with:

 CBFA2T2, 
 CBFA2T3, 
 Calcitriol receptor 
 GFI1, 
 Nuclear receptor co-repressor 1, 
 Nuclear receptor co-repressor 2, 
 PRKAR2A, and
 Zinc finger and BTB domain-containing protein 16.

References

Further reading 

 
 
 
 
 
 
 
 
 
 
 
 
 
 
 
 
 
 

Transcription factors